Showdown in Little Tokyo is a 1991 American buddy cop action film directed by Mark L. Lester, who also produced with Martin E. Caan. The film stars Dolph Lundgren and Brandon Lee; it was the latter's first American film role. The film was released in the United States on August 23, 1991. Showdown in Little Tokyo was Dolph Lundgren's last Warner Bros Pictures film until 2018's Creed II.

Plot
Los Angeles cop Chris Kenner (Dolph Lundgren) is an American who was raised in Japan. He is given a new partner, Johnny Murata (Brandon Lee), an American of partial Japanese descent. Kenner does not appreciate American culture, while Johnny does not like Japanese culture much. One thing they both enjoy are the martial arts, in which they are both experts. The two are assigned to L.A.'s Little Tokyo, where they break up some criminal activity in a Japanese restaurant, and an arrest is made. While Kenner and Johnny are questioning the suspect, Kenner notices that he has tattoos of the Iron Claw Yakuza clan. This reminds him of when he was 9 years old and he witnessed his parents being killed by a member of the Yakuza. Before Kenner or Murata can interrogate the suspect further, he kills himself in the interrogation room by breaking his own neck.

The leader of the Iron Claw clan, Yoshida (Cary-Hiroyuki Tagawa), kills the owner of a popular downtown nightclub called the Bonsai Club by crushing the owner, Tanaka (Philip Tan), in a car compactor. To celebrate gaining ownership of the Bonsai Club, Yoshida throws a party at his house with all of the club staff. One of the girls at the party, named Angel (Renee Griffin), is revealed to have warned Tanaka about Yoshida behind his back, and this infuriates Yoshida who then questions Angel about her loyalty. She attempts to appease Yoshida by offering her body to him but Yoshida instead drugs Angel and strips off her clothes, and then fondles her from behind before beheading her.

When the coroner runs an analysis on Angel's body, it is revealed that the methamphetamines in her system would have led to her death anyway. This discovery of drugs, together with the suspect having Yakuza tattoos, prompts Kenner and Johnny to go to the Bonsai Club in search of information. There they meet lounge singer Minako Okeya (Tia Carrere), who was a good friend of Angel's. Before they can get any useful information out of her, they are ambushed and taken to see the nightclub's owner and Kenner recognizes Yoshida as the man who killed his parents. Yoshida is now a drug manufacturer using a local brewery as his distribution center. He uses smaller gangs such as the Hells Angels, Crips and Sureños to peddle the drugs for him, in return for a percentage of the profit. Enraged, Kenner pulls his gun on Yoshida and almost kills him to avenge the death of his parents, but Johnny manages to defuse the situation and they both leave the nightclub.

Later that night, Yoshida rapes and kidnaps Minako and holds her hostage in his home and vows to kill Kenner. Kenner and Johnny set out for Yoshida's heavily guarded home, where they rescue Minako. His pride wounded, Yoshida sends his men out to get Minako back. He has Kenner and Johnny captured, stripped topless and tortured, but Kenner and Johnny manage to escape. They then prepare an assault on Yoshida's brewery, where they rescue Minako once again. In the middle of a parade in the city, Kenner fights Yoshida in a duel, in which Kenner uses a sword to impale Yoshida on a giant, spinning firework called a Catherine wheel, which burns Yoshida while spinning at high speed, and then the wheel explodes and kills Yoshida.

Kenner and Johnny are then hailed as heroes by the crowd as they escort Minako away from the scene.

Cast

 Dolph Lundgren as Sergeant Chris Kenner
 Brandon Lee as Detective Johnny Murata
 Cary-Hiroyuki Tagawa as Funekei Yoshida (Nihongo: 吉田船渓, Yoshida Funekei)
 Tia Carrere as Minako Okeya (Nihongo: 桶屋美奈子, Okeya Minako)
 Toshirô Obata as Sato (Nihongo: 佐藤, Satō)
 Philip Tan as Tanaka (Nihongo: 田中, Tanaka)
 Rodney Kageyama as Eddie
 Ernie Lively as Detective Nelson
 James Taenaka as Hardboy
 Renee Griffin as Angel
 Reid Asato as Muto (Nihongo: 武藤, Mutō) 
 Takayo Fischer as Mama Yamaguchi 
 Simon Rhee as Ito (Nihongo: 伊藤, Itō)
 Vernee Watson-Johnson as Nonnie Russell - Coroner
 Lenny Imamura as Kickboxer #1
 Roger Yuan as Kickboxer #2
 Nathan Jung as Bonsai Club Manager

Music

Soundtrack
David Michael Frank

Release Date: December 11, 1991,
Formats: CD, Cassette

Main Title
The Iron Claw
Brewery Battle
Noble Quest
Death And Dishonor
Private Moment
Slippery When Wet
Yakety Yakuza
Saving Minako
Kenner And Johnny
Brewery Bust
Haydn Seek
Little Tokyo
Heavy Metal Sushi
Into The Vat
Death And Disfiguration

Reception

Box office
Warner Bros. was not happy with the film and re-edited it, only to give it a limited theatrical run in the United States, Mexico, Australia, France (where it skipped Paris), Italy, Israel and Hungary. Except for these markets, the film was released direct-to-video in 1992.

In the US opening weekend, the film grossed $455,192 from 140 theaters which was an average of $3,251 per theater. This accounted for 20% of the film's total gross.

It ranked #9 in Hungary's Top 10 of 1992 Overall Box Office Grosses (according to the 1994 Variety International Film Guide), grossing $197,590 in Hungary.

After Brandon Lee's untimely death while filming The Crow (1994), movies with Lee in leading roles, such as Showdown in Little Tokyo, saw a surge in video sales.

The film became a cult classic among action fans after its release. Director Mark L. Lester said: “I was going for exaggerated reality. Kind of a pop art thing or a comic book. But Warner took about ten minutes out of the film, which were pretty good actually. They changed it all around. They didn’t do a big release, but I guess people liked it.“

Critical response
The movie faced largely negative reviews from critics.  Vincent Canby of The New York Times described it as "violent, but spiritless." It holds a rating of 33% on Rotten Tomatoes based on 9 reviews, with an average score of 4.3/10.

Contemporary reviews 
Upon its 2015 DVD release, DVD Talk reviewer Ian Jane wrote that it was a shallow but highly enjoyable action film of its time. He found it fast paced, action packed, and funny. He felt it had good photography, nice locations, and that Brandon Lee shined in his role.

Contemporary critic Chris Coffel of Bloody Disgusting praised it for being a well-made action film of its time, and that both leads delivered their roles well. He also praised the lead villain Cary-Hiroyuki Tagawa. Finally he felt the movie fell flat on the humorous side of things, but was great fun for its genre.

On JoBlo.com, writer Chris Bumbray considers it to be an underrated gem and a cult classic. He thinks that Lee steals the show from Lundgren and that the film showcases the range of the early departed actor. His final thought was that it was a fun B actioner.

References

External links

Dolph - the ultimate guide

1991 films
1991 action films
1991 martial arts films
1990s buddy cop films
1990s police procedural films
American films about revenge
American action films
American buddy cop films
American martial arts films
American police detective films
Films about violence
Films directed by Mark L. Lester
Films scored by David Michael Frank
Films set in Los Angeles
Films shot in California
Japan in non-Japanese culture
Films about Japanese Americans
Rape and revenge films
Warner Bros. films
Yakuza films
1990s English-language films
1990s American films